The 2012 CFL Draft took place on Thursday, May 3, 2012 at 3:00 PM ET on TSN. 45 players were chosen from among eligible players from Canadian Universities across the country, as well as Canadian players playing in the NCAA. The Calgary Stampeders had the most selections with eight, while Hamilton had seven picks. The Toronto Argonauts and Montreal Alouettes each had six and the Edmonton Eskimos and Winnipeg Blue Bombers had five picks. The defending Grey Cup champion BC Lions and the Saskatchewan Roughriders had the fewest selections with just four. A total of three trades involving 11 draft picks in this draft were made on the draft day itself. Of the 45 draft selections, 24 players were drafted from Canadian Interuniversity Sport institutions, which is the lowest percentage of CIS players taken since 2006 (26 of 50, 52%, were selected then). It is also the lowest number of CIS players taken since the 2000 CFL Draft when just 22 out of 46 players were chosen.

The first two rounds were broadcast live on TSN with CFL Commissioner Mark Cohon announcing each selection. The production was hosted by Rod Black and featured the CFL on TSN panel which included Duane Forde, Chris Schultz, Dave Naylor, Farhan Lalji, Blake Nill, Jeff Cummins, and Stefan Ptaszek who analyzed the teams' needs and picks.

Top prospects 
60 of the top Canadian athletes attended the 2012 CFL Evaluation Camp which took place March 2–4 in Toronto. Below is a table with the CFL Scouting Bureau rankings of the top CFL Draft prospects.

Trades
In the explanations below, (D) denotes trades that took place during the draft, while (PD) indicates trades completed pre-draft.

Round one
 Montreal → BC (PD). Montreal traded this selection to BC for Sean Whyte.
 Toronto → Edmonton (PD). Toronto traded this selection, Steven Jyles and Grant Shaw to Edmonton for Ricky Ray.
 Edmonton → BC (D). Edmonton traded this selection and the 20th overall pick in this year's draft to BC for the fourth overall pick, the 14th overall pick, and the 38th overall pick in this year's draft.
 BC → Edmonton (D). BC traded this selection, the 14th overall pick, and the 38th overall pick in this year's draft to Edmonton for the second overall pick and the 20th overall pick in this year's draft.
 Hamilton → Winnipeg (D). Hamilton traded this selection to Winnipeg for the eighth overall pick in the 2012 CFL Draft and the 13th overall pick in the 2012 CFL Draft.

Round two
 Saskatchewan → Winnipeg (PD). Saskatchewan traded this selection, a fourth round pick in the 2012 CFL Draft, and a conditional draft pick in the 2013 CFL Draft to Winnipeg for Odell Willis and a conditional fifth round draft pick in the 2013 CFL Draft.
 BC → Edmonton (D). BC traded this selection, the fourth overall pick, and the 38th overall pick in this year's draft to Edmonton for the second overall pick and the 20th overall pick in this year's draft.
 Winnipeg → Hamilton (D). Winnipeg traded this selection and the 13th overall pick in this year's draft to Hamilton for the third overall pick in this year's draft.
 Winnipeg → Hamilton (D). Winnipeg traded this selection and the eighth overall pick in this year's draft to Hamilton for the third overall pick in this year's draft.
 Calgary → Saskatchewan (D). Calgary traded this selection and the 35th overall pick in this year's draft to Saskatchewan for the 15th overall pick in this year's draft and a second round pick in the 2013 CFL Draft.

Round three
 BC → Hamilton (PD). BC traded this selection and a conditional pick in the 2013 CFL Draft to Hamilton for Arland Bruce III.
 Toronto → Winnipeg (PD). Toronto traded this selection and a first round pick in the 2011 CFL Draft to Winnipeg for Steven Jyles. This selection, originally a fourth round pick, could be upgraded to as high as a second round pick, contingent upon the number of games that Jyles plays for Toronto. Jyles played in eight games and this pick became a third round selection.
 Edmonton → BC (D). Edmonton traded this selection and the second overall pick in this year's draft to BC for the fourth overall pick, the 14th overall pick, and the 38th overall pick in this year's draft.
 Saskatchewan → Calgary (D). Saskatchewan traded this selection and a second round pick in the 2013 CFL Draft to Calgary for the 12th overall pick in this year's draft and the 35th overall pick in this year's draft.

Round four
 BC → Calgary (PD). BC traded this selection and a second round pick in the 2011 CFL Draft to Calgary for Jesse Newman.
 Edmonton → Toronto (PD). Edmonton traded this selection to Toronto for Delroy Clarke.
 Saskatchewan → Winnipeg (PD). Saskatchewan traded this selection, a second round pick in the 2012 CFL Draft, and a conditional draft pick in the 2013 CFL Draft to Winnipeg for Odell Willis and a conditional fifth round draft pick in the 2013 CFL Draft.

Round five
 Saskatchewan → Winnipeg (PD). Saskatchewan traded this selection, a sixth round pick in the 2010 CFL Draft, Adarius Bowman, Jean-François Morin-Roberge, Brady Browne, and a player from the Roughriders negotiation list to Winnipeg for a fifth round pick in the 2009 CFL Draft, a fifth round pick in the 2011 or 2012 CFL Draft, the option to swap first round picks in the 2010 CFL Draft, Dan Goodspeed, and the rights to Tyler Roehl.
 Winnipeg → Calgary (PD). Winnipeg traded this selection conditionally to Calgary for Pat MacDonald.
 Winnipeg → BC (PD). Winnipeg traded this selection conditionally to BC for Kelly Bates.
 BC → Edmonton (D). BC traded this selection, the fourth overall pick, and the 14th overall pick in this year's draft to Edmonton for the second overall pick and the 20th overall pick in this year's draft.
 Calgary → Saskatchewan (D). Calgary traded this selection and the 12th overall pick in this year's draft to Saskatchewan for the 15th overall pick in this year's draft and a second round pick in the 2013 CFL Draft.

Round six
 Hamilton → Toronto (PD). Hamilton traded this selection conditionally to Toronto for Steve Schmidt.
 Edmonton → Montreal (PD). Edmonton traded this selection and a sixth-round pick in the 2013 CFL Draft to Montreal for Dylan Steenbergen.
 Winnipeg → Calgary (PD). Winnipeg traded this selection to Calgary for Neil Ternovatsky.

Forfeitures
 Winnipeg forfeits their first round selection after selecting Kito Poblah in the 2011 Supplemental Draft.
 Edmonton forfeits their second round selection after selecting Ted Laurent in the 2011 Supplemental Draft.
 BC forfeits their sixth round selection after selecting Alex Ellis in the 2011 Supplemental Draft.

Round one

Round two

Round three

Round four

Round five

Round six

References

Canadian College Draft
2012 in Canadian football